Phymaturus patagonicus, the Patagonia mountain lizard, is a species of lizard in the family Liolaemidae. It is from Argentina.

References

patagonicus
Lizards of South America
Reptiles of Argentina
Endemic fauna of Argentina
Reptiles described in 1898
Taxa named by Julio Germán Koslowsky